Some Things You Need to Know Before the World Ends (A Final Evening with the Illuminati) is a comedy play by Larry Larson and Levi Lee, first performed in 1981 at the Nexus Theatre in Atlanta Georgia.  It was performed at the Humana Festival at the Actor's Theatre of Louisville in 1986 and subsequently published by Dramatists Play Service.  It has since become popular among regional theatres. It was staged in Chicago in 2002.

The play follows an evening church service with the Reverend Eddie, a Protestant minister, and his assistant, Brother Lawrence, in a dilapidated church.  The audience functions as Eddie's congregation.  The script draws from conspiracy theories (including the titular Illuminati, as well as the assassination of John F. Kennedy and the Freemasons), vaudeville humor, and pop culture references, such as Paul Lynde and The Seventh Seal (whereby the Reverend Eddie plays a game of basketball against Death).

References

American plays
1981 plays